Carlos Javier Acuña Caballero (born 23 June 1988) is a Paraguayan professional footballer who plays as a forward for spanish club Hércules CF.

Club career
Acuña was born in Encarnación. In 2004, he helped Paraguay win the Under-16 South American Championship, also topping the goal charts. He was immediately bought by Cádiz CF of Spain for a club record of around 100 million pesetas, but had to wait one year in the sidelines, however, to make his official debut, as the Andalusians already had their foreign-players quota full.

From 2006 to 2008, Acuña represented Cádiz and UD Salamanca, both in the second division (the latter on loan). On 16 December 2008, Real Madrid confirmed an agreement for the transfer of the player for five years; he was immediately sent to the B-side, in the third level.

Subsequently, Acuña played three seasons in the Spanish second level, with Recreativo de Huelva and Girona FC. He scored a career-best 17 goals – plus one in the unsuccessful promotion playoffs – with the latter in the 2012–13 campaign.

After seeing out his contract at Real Madrid, Acuña was signed by Serie A's Udinese Calcio in late June 2013. However, within a matter of weeks, he moved to sister club Watford on a three-year contract. He scored his first goal for his new team on 24 September, in a 2–3 home loss to Norwich City for the season's League Cup.

In early January 2014, Acuña returned to Spain, being loaned to CA Osasuna until June. He made his La Liga debut on the 12th, playing the last 32 minutes of a 2–1 away win over Real Betis.

Acuña returned to his country on 1 August 2014, signing with Club Olimpia for an undisclosed fee. On 30 July 2015, he was loaned to RCD Mallorca for one year.

On 17 June 2016, Acuña signed a two-year deal with CD Numancia also in the Spanish second tier. On 2 January 2018, after a six-month spell in Thailand with Ratchaburi Mitr Phol FC, he joined Albacete Balompié for the remainder of the season. On 4 December 2018 he renewed his contract with the club until 2021.

On 31 August 2020, Acuña signed with Hércules CF.

Career statistics

Club

References

External links

1988 births
Living people
People from Encarnación, Paraguay
Paraguayan people of Spanish descent
Paraguayan footballers
Association football forwards
Paraguayan Primera División players
Club Olimpia footballers
La Liga players
Segunda División players
Segunda División B players
Cádiz CF players
UD Salamanca players
Real Madrid Castilla footballers
Recreativo de Huelva players
Girona FC players
CA Osasuna players
RCD Mallorca players
CD Numancia players
Albacete Balompié players
Hércules CF players
Udinese Calcio players
English Football League players
Watford F.C. players
Javier Acuna
Javier Acuna
Paraguay under-20 international footballers
Paraguayan expatriate footballers
Expatriate footballers in Spain
Expatriate footballers in England
Expatriate footballers in Thailand
Paraguayan expatriate sportspeople in Spain
Paraguayan expatriate sportspeople in England